Kenjiro Nomura may refer to:
 Kenjiro Nomura (baseball)
 Kenjiro Nomura (artist)